The Matra MS610 is a lightweight rally car and sports car, designed, developed and built by Matra in 1965. It was Matra's first sports prototype race car.

References 

Matra vehicles
Sports racing cars
Mid-engined cars
1960s cars
Cars of France
Rally cars